Seth Glier is an American singer-songwriter, pianist, guitarist, and activist.

Career
Seth Glier was born in Shelburne Falls, MA. and subsequently studied at Pioneer Valley Performing Arts Charter School PVPA in South Hadley, Massachusetts. He attended Berklee College of Music for a year before dropping out to be able to tour full-time. Since then, he has averaged over 200 shows a year, and shared stages with artists such as James Taylor, Mark Knopfler, The Verve Pipe, Edwin McCain and Ani DiFranco. He has appeared as a mainstage artist at the Falcon Ridge Folk Festival (NY) and the Kerrville Folk Festival (TX). USA Today compared Seth to Bruce Springsteen and Billy Joel.

In 2015, Glier released his fourth album, If I Could Change One Thing, on MPress Records. The album was considered a successful move into mainstream pop, a departure from his previous, more acoustic albums. A music video for the title track, a duet with American Idol alum Crystal Bowersox, premiered on Billboard.com.

In 2016, Glier gave a TEDx talk sharing his insight on the challenges and gifts of care giving for a family member, and how it influences his life, art and music.

Glier's 2021 album The Coronation combines elements of folk, pop, and electronica and explores themes of growth, forgiveness, and envisioning a better world.

Awards

Glier's 2011 album, The Next Right Thing, for which he recorded his own vocals in his parents’ basement was nominated for a Grammy Award in the category of "Best Engineered Album, Non-Classical."

In 2011, he took home Best Love Song for his track "Naia" at the 10th Annual Independent Music Awards. In 2012, "Next Right Thing" won Best Social Action Song at the Independent Music Awards.

Causes
Glier is an outspoken advocate for autism awareness and has been a national spokesperson for the Autism awareness organization Autism Speaks. His song "Love Is A Language" was inspired by his nonverbal autistic brother.

Glier was previously an artist partner with ChildFund International. Glier showcased ChildFund's work and encouraged his fans to reach out to children in crisis by sponsoring a child (or multiple children) with the organization. 

In 2018, Glier toured in Mongolia, China, and Ukraine as part of the American Music Abroad program, an initiative of the U.S. Department of State's Bureau of Educational and Cultural Affairs. A 2020 tour of Mexico planned with the American Music Abroad program was canceled due to COVID-19.

Discography

The Trouble With People (2009)
The Next Right Thing (2011)
Things I Should Let You Know (2013)
If I Could Change One Thing (2015)
Birds (2017)
The Coronation (2021)

References

External links
 

Living people
People from Shelburne Falls, Massachusetts
Singer-songwriters from Massachusetts
American folk singers
American male singer-songwriters
Grammy Awards
Independent Music Awards winners
American pianists
1988 births
Guitarists from Massachusetts
American male pianists
American male guitarists
21st-century American singers
21st-century American male singers